Gigante may refer to:

People
Giacinto Gigante (1806–1876), Italian painter
Louis Gigante, retired Catholic priest and a brother of mobsters Mario and Vincent
Mario Gigante (born 1923), Caporegime in the Genovese crime family
Michael Gigante (born 1969), American record producer
Sarah Gigante (born 2000), Australian racing cyclist
Vincent Gigante (1928–2005), boss of the Genovese crime family
El Gigante, or Jorge Gonzáles, former basketball player and professional wrestler

Media
Gigante (film), a 2009 Uruguayan film
Sábado Gigante ("Giant Saturday"), an American Spanish-language TV program

Other
Gigante, Huila, Colombia
Supermercados Gigante, a Mexican supermarket chain

See also
Gigantes (disambiguation)